Events from the year 1617 in Sweden

Incumbents
 Monarch – Gustaf II Adolf

Events

 - The Ordningen för ständernas sammanträden 1617; the Riksdag is given a formal organization. 
 - Treaty of Stolbovo
 - By the Örebro stadga, conversion to Catholicism is made punishable by death and fortitude of property. 
 - Coronation of the King.
 - Ethica christiana by Laurentius Paulinus.
 - Polish–Swedish War (1617–18)

Births

Deaths

References

 
Years of the 17th century in Sweden
Sweden